Ormosia excelsa is a plant species in the genus Ormosia, a tropical legume.

Ormosia excelsa produces the O-methylated isoflavone 5-O-methylgenistein.

References

External links

excelsa